Blondin Park is an  public park in Northfields in the London Borough of Ealing. It has allotments area and sports pitches. It is owned by Ealing Council and managed by the Council together with the Friends of Blondin Park.

History
The site was acquired by the Municipal Borough of Ealing in 1928 and opened as a public park called Northfields Recreation Ground. In 1957 it was renamed Blondin Park after Charles Blondin, who lived locally in Niagara House. The Blondin Nature Area was created in 1997.

Ecology

The nature reserve has a variety of habitats, including a wildflower meadow and a pond, where wetland plants have been introduced such as lesser pond-sedge, sharp-flowered rush and greater spearwort.

Access
There is access from Boston Manor Road.

References

External links
Friends of Blondin Park

Nature reserves in the London Borough of Ealing
Local nature reserves in Greater London
Parks and open spaces in the London Borough of Ealing